Pantacordis pallida is a moth of the family Autostichidae. It is found in mainland Italy and on Malta and Sicily. It is also found in Morocco and Algeria.

The wingspan is 10–12 mm. Adults are dirty yellowish with a very light darker sprinkling on the forewings.

References

Moths described in 1876
Pantacordis
Moths of Europe